Higher Whitley is a settlement in Cheshire, England.

Together with Lower Whitley, it is a part of the civil parish of Whitley, which was formed on 1 April 1936, situated in the unitary authority of Cheshire West and Chester, in the county of Cheshire, England. In 1931 the parish had a population of 339. It is north of Lower Whitley on a map.

References

Villages in Cheshire
Former civil parishes in Cheshire
Cheshire West and Chester